Katia Mosconi (born 28 April 1973) is an Italian short track speed skater. She competed in three events at the 1994 Winter Olympics.

References

External links
 

1973 births
Living people
Italian female short track speed skaters
Olympic short track speed skaters of Italy
Short track speed skaters at the 1994 Winter Olympics
People from Aosta
Sportspeople from Aosta Valley